A mathlete is a person who competes in mathematics competitions at any level or any age. More specifically, a Mathlete is a student who participates in any of the MATHCOUNTS programs, as Mathlete is a registered trademark of the MATHCOUNTS Foundation in the United States. The term is a portmanteau of the words mathematics and athlete. 

Top Mathletes from MATHCOUNTS often go on to compete in the AIME, USAMO, and ARML competitions in the United States. Those in other countries generally participate in national olympiads to qualify for the International Mathematical Olympiad.

Participants in World Math Day also are commonly referred to as mathletes.

Mathletic competitions
The Putnam Exam: The William Lowell Putnam Competition is the preeminent undergraduate level mathletic competition in the United States. Administered by the Mathematical Association of America, students compete as individuals and as teams (as chosen by their Institution) for scholarships and team prize money. The exam is administered on the first saturday in December.

Mathletic off-season training
The academic off-season (traditionally referred to as "summer") can be especially difficult on mathletes, though various training regimens have been proposed to keep mathletic ability at its peak. Publications such as the MAA's The American Mathematical Monthly and the AMS's Notices of the American Mathematical Society are widely read to maintain and hone mathematical ability. Some coaches suggest seeking research internships or grants, many of which are funded by the National Science Foundation.

At higher levels, mathletes can obtain funding from host institutions to work on summer research projects. For example, the University of Delaware offers the Groups Exploring the Mathematical Sciences project (GEMS project) to first year graduate students. The students act as the principal investigator and work with an undergraduate research assistant and a faculty adviser who will oversee their summer research.

References

External links
 World Math Day
 Algorithm Olympics

Mathematics competitions